Praia de Santa Mónica (Portuguese meaning "beach of Saint Monica") is a sandy beach in the southwestern part of the island of Boa Vista in Cape Verde. The nearest village is Povoação Velha, 5 km to the north. The beach is adjacent to the protected area Morro de Areia Nature Reserve, which is important for endemic birds and turtles. Praia de Santa Mónica is part of a tourism development zone.

References 

Beaches of Cape Verde
Geography of Boa Vista, Cape Verde